Pontén is a surname. Notable people with the surname include: 

 Anders Pontén (1934–2009), Swedish author, journalist, and actor
 Gunilla Pontén (1929–2019), Swedish fashion designer
 Gunvor Pontén (1929–2023), Swedish actress
 Henrik Pontén (1965–2020), Swedish jurist 
 Tomas Pontén (1946–2015), Swedish actor and director